"I'm So Lonely" is the ninth single by the Liverpool britpop band Cast, fronted by ex La's bassist John Power.

Formats and track listings
CD 1
 "I'm So Lonely"
 "The Things You Make Me Do"
 "Never Gonna Tell You What To Do (live)"
 "History (Lo Fidelity All Stars remix)"

CD 2 (enhanced)
 "I'm So Lonely"
 "Theme From"
 "History (Headrillaz remix)"
 "Guiding Star" (video) and vintage interview footage

Personnel
Cast
 John Power – vocals, guitar
 Peter Wilkinson – backing vocals, bass
 Liam "Skin" Tyson – guitar
 Keith O'Neill – drums

Production
 John Leckie – producer
 Pete Lewis – mixing

Chart performance

References

1997 singles
Cast (band) songs
Songs written by John Power (musician)
Song recordings produced by John Leckie
Polydor Records singles